Aleksandr Arkadyevich Tuchkin (born 15 July 1964) is a Russian team handball player and Olympic champion from 2000 in Sydney.  He received a bronze medal at the 2004 Summer Olympics in Athens with the Russian national team.

He participated on the Soviet team that won gold medals at the 1988 Summer Olympics in Seoul.

References

External links 
 
 
 

1964 births
Living people
Sportspeople from Lviv
Soviet male handball players
Russian male handball players
Olympic handball players of Russia
Handball players at the 1988 Summer Olympics
Handball players at the 2000 Summer Olympics
Handball players at the 2004 Summer Olympics
Olympic gold medalists for Russia
Olympic bronze medalists for Russia
Olympic gold medalists for the Soviet Union
Olympic handball players of the Soviet Union
Olympic medalists in handball
Medalists at the 2004 Summer Olympics
Medalists at the 2000 Summer Olympics
Medalists at the 1988 Summer Olympics